The 1955 Florida State Seminoles football team represented Florida State University as an independent during the 1955 college football season. Led by third-year head coach Tom Nugent, the Seminoles compiled a record of 5–5.

Schedule

References

Florida State
Florida State Seminoles football seasons
Florida State Seminoles football